Warm Strangers is singer-songwriter Vienna Teng's second album.

Track listing
Feather Moon – 4:06
Harbor – 4:24
Hope on Fire – 4:26
Shine – 2:39
Mission Street – 4:32
My Medea – 4:09
Shasta (Carrie's Song) – 3:29
Homecoming (Walter's Song) – 5:48
Anna Rose – 3:07
Passage – 4:19
The Atheist Christmas Carol – 4:26
Green Island Serenade – 3:16
Boy at the Piano (Bonus Live Track for international release)
Hope on Fire (Bonus Live Track for international release)

Notes
"Shasta" was inspired by the view of snow-covered volcano Mount Shasta from the Interstate 5 highway.

"Passage" is the only song to date that Vienna has recorded with no instrumental accompaniment, only vocals. It is sung from the point of view of a girl who died in a car crash. The CD liner provides no lyrics for "Passage."

"Green Island Serenade" is a separate, but hidden track found at the end of the album. It is a traditional song performed in Mandarin Chinese.

According to the album insert a portion of the proceeds from this album will go to Amnesty International and the Union of Concerned Scientists.

References

2004 albums
Vienna Teng albums